Now Dehak may refer to:
 Now Dehak, Babol, Mazandaran Province
 Now Dehak, Neka, Mazandaran Province
 Now Dehak, Qazvin